Aritinngithigh (Aritinngayth, Arraythinngith) is an Australian aboriginal language once spoken in Cape York in Queensland.

Phonology

Consonant Phonemes

Vowel Phonemes

References

Northern Paman languages
Extinct languages of Queensland